Lígia Silva (born March 6, 1981 in Manaus, Amazonas) is a table tennis player from Brazil.  She has competed in three Olympic Games.

References

Olympic table tennis players of Brazil
Table tennis players at the 2000 Summer Olympics
Table tennis players at the 2004 Summer Olympics
Brazilian female table tennis players
Table tennis players at the 2012 Summer Olympics
Living people
People from Manaus
1981 births
Pan American Games medalists in table tennis
Pan American Games silver medalists for Brazil
Pan American Games bronze medalists for Brazil
South American Games gold medalists for Brazil
South American Games silver medalists for Brazil
South American Games bronze medalists for Brazil
South American Games medalists in table tennis
Table tennis players at the 1999 Pan American Games
Table tennis players at the 2015 Pan American Games
Competitors at the 2006 South American Games
Competitors at the 2010 South American Games
Medalists at the 1999 Pan American Games
Medalists at the 2015 Pan American Games
Sportspeople from Amazonas (Brazilian state)
21st-century Brazilian women